Habashi (also Romanized as Ḩabashī) is a village in Pirsalman Rural District, in the Central District of Asadabad County, Hamadan Province, Iran. At the 2006 census, its population was 649, in 171 families.

References 

Populated places in Asadabad County